TV5 (in ), also known as Coran TV (in ), is the fifth Algerian public national television channel. It is part of the state-owned Public Establishment of Television, along with TV1, TV2, TV3, TV4, TV6, TV7, TV8 and TV9. It is dedicated to religious programs and Quran.

History
TV5 was launched on 18 March 2009, it has started to broadcast its programmes on 18 March 2009.

Programmes

References

External links
  
 

Arab mass media
Television in Algeria
Arabic-language television stations
Arabic-language television
Television channels and stations established in 2009
Television stations in Algeria